The Yangkaal, also spelt Yanggal, are an Aboriginal Australian people of area of the Gulf of Carpentaria in the state of Queensland.

Gananggalinda is a variant name of the same group.

Language

The Yangkaal language was also known as Yanggaralda, Janggal, Gananggalinda, Nemarang, and other names. Geoffrey O'Grady grouped it as a variety of Yukulta within the Tangkic language family. The implication was that "Yanggal" was simply an alternative name for "Njangga", which is an alternative ethnonym for the Yanyula (Yanyuwa), from which the word Yanggal may have derived.

Country
Much of the continental coastland used by the Yangkaal was mangrovial.

David Horton reported in The Encyclopaedia of Aboriginal Australia: Aboriginal and Torres Strait Islander history, society and culture that the traditional lands of the Gananggalinda were near Bayley Point and Point Parker on the coast of the Gulf of Carpentaria. The Gananggalinda and their neighbours the Yukulta / Ganggalidda have similar culture and language.

Social organisation
The Yangkaal were composed of at least three kin groups:
 The Djo:ara (Beche-de-Mer Camp and Bayley (Robert) Island.)
 Laraksnja:ra (eastern part of Forsyth Island.)
 Mara'kalpa (western side of Forsyth Island.)
 A clan once resident on Denham Island.

History of contact
The Yangkaal eventually moved to Mornington Island, where Arthur Capell briefly interviewed one informant, and obtained information, some of which turned out to be unreliable. He was told that their name for their homeland on Forsyth Island was Nemi, from which he deduced that their language was Nemarang. This misapprehension was corrected by Norman Tindale, who explained that this term was the personal name of a Yangkaal person known on the Mornington Island Mission as Edward Nemie, the latter being a distortion of the missionary's word "name".

Alternative names
 Njanggad.
 Janggaral.
 Janggura.
 Janggaralda.
 Jangaralda. (Lardil exonym)
 Nemarang (recent autonym formed from the English word 'name')
 Balumbant. ('westerners' as opposed to Lilumbant, used of the Lardiil and Yokula).

Some words
 bidinaŋga. (man)
 magudaŋga. (woman)
 ganda. (father)
 ŋama. (mother).

Notes

Citations

Sources

Aboriginal peoples of Queensland